Cyclostrema eumares is a species of sea snail, a marine gastropod mollusk in the family Liotiidae.

Distribution
This marine species occurs in the Gulf of Oman.

References

External links
 Trew, A., 1984. The Melvill-Tomlin Collection. Part 30. Trochacea. Handlists of the Molluscan Collections in the Department of Zoology, National Museum of Wales.
 Bosch D.T., Dance S.P., Moolenbeek R.G. & Oliver P.G. (1995) Seashells of eastern Arabia. Dubai: Motivate Publishing. 296 pp

eumares
Gastropods described in 1904